Laleh Khadivi (born Esfahan, Iran) is an Iranian American novelist, and filmmaker.

Life
Khadivi was born to a Kurdish family in Iran in 1977. Shortly after the Iranian Revolution, her family emigrated to the United States with her family in 1979, settling in the San Francisco Bay Area. She graduated from Reed College and from Mills College with an MFA. In 2002 she began to research the Kurds, particularly their fate in the southwestern region of Iran under the first Shah. Her first novel, The Age of Orphans, is the story of a Kurdish boy whose father is killed in a battle with the Iranian army in 1921. The boy is captured, becomes a soldier and eventually is turned into an oppressor of his own people.

Khadivi has worked extensively as a documentary filmmaker.
She taught at Emory University as the 2007-2009 Fiction Fellow. She also taught creative writing at Santa Clara University during the 2010-2011 school year. She currently resides in San Francisco, where she is a professor in the Writing department at University of San Francisco. Her debut novel, The Age of Orphans, has been translated into Dutch, Hebrew, and Italian.

Awards
 2008 Whiting Award
 Carl Djerassi Fellowship
 Emory Fiction Fellowship
 Soros Foundation Award

Works

Books
 
 
 
 A Map to the Dead. Mills College. 2006. (thesis/dissertation)

Films
 900 Women (2001)

Stories
"Air and Water", Virginia Quarterly Review, Winter 2009

References

External links
"Author's website"
Profile at The Whiting Foundation
"The Age of Orphans by Laleh Khadivi", Bookslut, March 2009

American women novelists
Reed College alumni
Mills College alumni
Emory University faculty
Living people
1977 births
20th-century American novelists
Iranian emigrants to the United States
20th-century American women writers
Novelists from Georgia (U.S. state)
American women academics
21st-century American women
University of San Francisco faculty
American writers of Iranian descent
American people of Kurdish descent
American filmmakers